Sirik-e Kohneh (also Romanized as Sīrīk-e Kohneh) is a village in Sirik Rural District, Byaban District, Minab County, Hormozgan Province, Iran. At the 2006 census, its population was 294, in 39 families.

References 

Populated places in Minab County